North Street is a road in the city centre of York, in England.

History
The area of North Street lay within the civilian settlement of Roman Eboracum.  A 2nd-century retaining river wall has been excavated, while evidence of craft working from the 9th- to the 11th-centuries has also been excavated.

The road was first recorded in about 1090, as Nordstreta, and by the 13th-century, this had become North Street.  Starting from the southern end of Ouse Bridge, then the only bridge in the city, it ran north along the south bank of the River Ouse, then turned sharply west, to run parallel to Micklegate.  This western section of the street was known for its tanneries, and known as Tanner Row, which is now regarded as a separate street.

The remaining section of North Street became known for its warehouses and yards, on the riverside.  In the early 1700s, a steam flour mill was established on the street, while in 1788, a private staith was built for better access to the river.  Around this time, some larger houses were built on the west side of the street, including in 1776 that of the architect Peter Atkinson.  The road later became known for its builders' merchants, with the most important being William Stead, founded in 1802.  By the early 20th-century, it was a mixed residential and shopping street.

Lying next to the river, the street has frequently suffered floods.  The first recorded flood was in 1263,
and the most recent serious flood was in 1931.  Regular floods combined with the local industry to make the street an undesirable location to live, by the early 19th-century, the street had become one of the poorest in the city.

By the 1960s, the street remained rundown.  Most of the buildings on the river side of the street were demolished, some dating back to the 17th-century, and were be replaced by the Viking Hotel and a riverside walk.  Some historic buildings across the street were restored.

Layout and architecture

The road runs north from the junction of Micklegate, Skeldergate and Bridge Street.  Initially, it is separated from the river by mostly modern buildings, then by the North Street Gardens, which contain a memorial to John Snow, who was born in a house on the street.

Buildings on the inland side of the street include Mill House, a former grain mill which is now the headquarters for the police in York, the Whippet Inn pub, the church of All Saints, North Street, and listed buildings at Church Cottages, as well as 33, 35 and 37, and 39 North Street.

Next to the church once lay a small building, built in 1900, which was sometimes described as the smallest house in England.  However, it was built as a store and was never used as a house.

The street now ends at the junction with Tanner Row, and its continuation is named Wellington Row.  This road is strongly associated with North Street, to the extent that the tower where it meets York City Walls has become known as "North Street Postern Tower".

References

Streets in York